Geminella is the scientific name for several genera of organisms and may refer to:
 Geminella (alga), a genus of green algae
 Geminella (bryozoan) Szczechura, 1994, a genus of fossil bryozoans
 Geminella (hydrozoan) Billard, 1925, a genus of hydrozoans